"Mareko (Here to Stay)" is a single by hip hop artist, Mareko released in 2003. The song hit #4 in New Zealand.

Song information
Mareko is the Samoan word for Mark.

Track listings
Mareko (Here To Stay)
Mareko (Here To Stay) (Instrumental)
Stop, Drop & Roll featuring the Deceptikonz
Stop, Drop & Roll (Instrumental)

Charts

Year-end charts

References

2003 singles
Mareko songs
2003 songs
Song articles with missing songwriters